Valley Brook is a town in Oklahoma County, Oklahoma, United States, and is part of the Oklahoma City Metropolitan Area. The population was 765 at the 2010 census.

History
On September 14, 2011, Valley Brook Police Chief Melvin Martin Fisher Jr.,  was arrested for drug trafficking due to his allegedly having possession of methamphetamine and marijuana. He was fired on May 22, 2012. In November 2012, he was found guilty and sentenced to ten years, although the sentence was suspended.

Geography
Valley Brook is located at  (35.403662, -97.482063).

Demographics

As of the census of 2000, there were 817 people, 298 households, and 204 families residing in the town. There were 337 housing units at an average density of 1,253.0 per square mile (481.9/km2). The racial makeup of the town was 77.48% White, 4.41% African American, 7.83% Native American, 0.37% Asian, 1.96% from other races, and 7.96% from two or more races. Hispanic or Latino of any race were 8.20% of the population.

There were 298 households, of which 35.6% had children under the age of 18 living with them, 45.0% were married couples living together, 15.8% had a female householder with no husband present, and 31.5% were non-families. 26.2% of all households were made up of individuals, and 8.7% had someone living alone who was 65 years of age or older. The average household size was 2.74 and the average family size was 3.25.

In the town, the population was spread out, with 30.6% under the age of 18, 10.5% from 18 to 24, 31.1% from 25 to 44, 19.1% from 45 to 64, and 8.7% who were 65 years of age or older. The median age was 30 years. For every 100 females, there were 98.3 males. For every 100 females age 18 and over, there were 98.3 males.

The median income for a household in the town was $21,193, and the median income for a family was $23,565. Males had a median income of $21,071 versus $17,569 for females. The per capita income for the town was $9,316. About 20.3% of families and 25.2% of the population were below the poverty line, including 31.9% of those under age 18 and 19.7% of those age 65 or over.

Revenues
Valley Brook collects a majority of its city revenue from its police force through traffic violations.

References

http://www.thelostogle.com/2013/08/27/2013-worst-of-okc-worst-suburban-police-force/
http://www.speedtrap.org/city/9056/Valley%20Brook

External links

 http://newsok.com/trial-pitting-valley-brook-police-officer-vs.-oklahoma-city-detective-continues/article/3677811
 http://kfor.com/2012/05/24/town-of-valley-brook-order-to-pay-damages/

Oklahoma City metropolitan area
Towns in Oklahoma County, Oklahoma
Towns in Oklahoma
Enclaves in the United States